Bardeh Gar-e Do Vark (also known as Bardeh Kar) is a village in Keshvar Rural District, Papi District, Khorramabad County, Lorestan Province, Iran. At the 2006 census, its population was 19, in 5 families.

References 

Towns and villages in Khorramabad County